The tetrafluoroammonium cation (also known as perfluoroammonium) is a positively charged polyatomic ion with chemical formula . It is equivalent to the ammonium ion where the hydrogen atoms surrounding the central nitrogen atom have been replaced by fluorine. Tetrafluoroammonium ion is isoelectronic with tetrafluoromethane , trifluoramine oxide  and the tetrafluoroborate  anion.

The tetrafluoroammonium ion forms salts with a large variety of fluorine-bearing anions. These include the bifluoride anion, tetrafluorobromate, metal pentafluorides ( where M is Ge, Sn, or Ti), hexafluorides ( where M is P, As, Sb, Bi, or Pt), heptafluorides ( where M is W, U, or Xe), octafluorides, various oxyfluorides ( where M is W or U;), and perchlorate. Attempts to make the nitrate salt, were unsuccessful because of quick fluorination:  +  →  + .

Structure 
The geometry of the tetrafluoroammonium ion is tetrahedral, with an estimated nitrogen-fluorine bond length of 124 pm. All fluorine atoms are in equivalent positions.

Synthesis 
Tetrafluoroammonium salts are prepared by oxidising nitrogen trifluoride with fluorine in the presence of a strong Lewis acid which acts as a fluoride ion acceptor. The original synthesis by Tolberg, Rewick, Stringham, and Hill in 1966 employs antimony pentafluoride as the Lewis acid:

  +  +  → 

The hexafluoroarsenate salt was also prepared by a similar reaction with arsenic pentafluoride at 120 °C:

  +  +  → 

The reaction of nitrogen trifluoride with fluorine and boron trifluoride at 800 °C yields the tetrafluoroborate salt:

  +  +  → 

Many tetrafluoroammonium salts can be prepared with metathesis reactions.

Reactions 
Tetrafluoroammonium salts are extremely hygroscopic. Some hydrogen peroxide is also formed during this process:

 +  →  +  +  

 + 2  →  +  + 

Properties
Because  salts are destroyed by water, water cannot be used as a solvent. Instead, bromine trifluoride, bromine pentafluoride, iodine pentafluoride, or anhydrous hydrogen fluoride can be used.

Tetrafluoroammonium salts usually have no colour. However, some are coloured due to other elements in them.

Applications 
 salts are important for solid propellant  gas generators. They are also used as reagents for electrophilic fluorination of aromatic compounds in organic chemistry. As fluorinating agents, they are also strong enough to react with methane.

See also 
Trifluorooxonium
Nitrogen pentafluoride

References 

Cations
Nitrogen fluorides
Fluorinating agents
Nitrogen(V) compounds
Nitrogen–halogen compounds